Dorothea Binz (16 March 1920 – 2 May 1947) was a Nazi German officer and supervisor at Ravensbrück concentration camp during the Holocaust. She was executed for war crimes.

Life
Born to a lower middle-class German family in Försterei Dusterlake, Brandenburg, Germany, Binz attended school until she was 15. She volunteered for kitchen work at Ravensbrück in August 1939, and was given a position of Aufseherin (female overseer) the following month.

Camp work
Binz served as an Aufseherin under Oberaufseherin Emma Zimmer, Johanna Langefeld, Maria Mandl, and Anna Klein. Though she worked under higher-ranking guards, Binz was known as "the true star of the camp", and the "chief guard was completely overshadowed by her deputy." She worked in various parts of the camp, including the kitchen and laundry. Later, she is said to have supervised the bunker where prisoners were tortured and killed. She began as deputy director of her penal block in September 1940, and became director of the cell block in the summer of 1942.

Binz was unofficially promoted to Stellvertretende Oberaufseherin (Deputy Chief Wardress) in July 1943; the promotion was made official in February 1944. Her abuse was later described as "unyielding". She was known to "watch for the weakest or most fearful prisoners, whom she would then shower with lashes or blows." As a member of the command staff between 1943 and 1945, she directed training and assigned duties to over 100 female guards at one time. Binz reportedly trained some of the cruelest female guards in the system, including Ruth Closius.

At Ravensbrück, the young Binz is said to have beaten, slapped, kicked, shot, whipped, stomped and abused prisoners continuously. Witnesses testified that when she appeared at the Appellplatz, "silence fell." She reportedly carried a whip in hand, along with a leashed German Shepherd, and at a moment's notice would kick prisoners to death or select them to be killed. She reportedly had a boyfriend in the camp, an SS officer, Edmund Bräuning. The couple reportedly went on romantic walks around the camp to watch prisoners being flogged, after which they would stroll away laughing. They lived together in a house outside the camp walls until late 1944, when Bräuning was transferred to Buchenwald concentration camp.

Capture and execution
Binz fled Ravensbrück during the death march, was captured on 3 May 1945 by the British in Hamburg, and incarcerated in the Recklinghausen camp (formerly a Buchenwald subcamp). She was tried for war crimes with other SS personnel by a British court in the Ravensbrück trial in 1947. Binz was found guilty and sentenced to death. Hours after her death sentence was confirmed in April 1947, Binz attempted to kill herself by slashing her wrists. However, officials intervened before she could bleed to death. Binz was subsequently hanged at Hamelin Prison by British executioner Albert Pierrepoint on 2 May 1947.

References

Sources
Information in this article comes from the following sources: 
 Adele, Wendy & Sarti, Marie. Women and Nazis: Perpetrators of Genocide and Other Crimes During Hitler's Regime, 1933-1945. Academia Press, Palo Alto CA, 2011. 
 Erpel, Simone. "Im Gefolge der SS": Aufseherinnen des Frauen-Konzentrationslagers Ravensbrück. Berlin, 2007.

1920 births
1947 deaths
People from Templin
People from the Province of Brandenburg
Nazi Party members
Female guards in Nazi concentration camps
Executed German women
Hamburg Ravensbrück trials executions
Executed people from Brandenburg